Pardhan may refer to:
Pardhan language
Pardhan people